KIRV (1510 kHz) is a commercial AM radio station broadcasting a Spanish-language Christian radio format. It is licensed to Fresno, California and is owned by Centro Cristiano Viva Abundante, Inc.

By day, KIRV is powered at 10,000 watts.  It uses a directional antenna with a two-tower array.  But 1510 AM is a clear channel frequency, so the station must sign off the air at sunset.  This requirement was originally instituted to protect the signal of KGA in Spokane, Washington, a former Class A clear channel station on 1510 kHz.

History

The Federal Communications Commission authorized the granting of a construction permit for a new radio station on 1510 kHz in Fresno to Irving E. Penberthy on October 31, 1961. Penberthy was a Baptist minister and plans were initially announced for the station to specialize in Christian radio programs. This was changed before broadcasting began.

At the end of 1965, Penberthy reached a deal to sell KIRV to general manager Robert Eurich. Eurich owned the station until New Life Enterprises acquired it in 1974. One of the partners in New Life was Jim Patterson, who later became mayor of Fresno between 1993 and 2001. Patterson was a second-generation broadcaster; he had previously been employed at KBIF, which was owned by his father Norwood until he lost ownership of it in a tax case. Norwood was also involved with Visalia's KICU-TV. Patterson, who was joined by Dan Jantz and Dennis Klassen in the partnership, frequently aired his conservative political views on KIRV programs. The station lost $400 in its first full year as a Christian outlet but made $44,000 of revenue by 1980.

The 500-watt station upgraded to its present 10,000 watts after the construction of two new towers in the antenna array was approved in 1979.

Though not active in management in the later years, Patterson continued to own KIRV until 1999, when it was sold to Gore-Overgaard Broadcasting. Gore-Overgaard sold KIRV to current owner Centro Cristiano Vida Abundante in December 2012 for $600,000.

References

External links
Pre-2013 KIRV website

IRV
IRV
1962 establishments in California
Radio stations established in 1962